Laurel is a surname which may refer to:

 Alicia Bay Laurel (born 1949),  American artist, author and musician
 Arsenio Laurel (1931–1967), Filipino race car driver, son of José P. Laurel
 Brenda Laurel, an advocate for girl video game development
 José P. Laurel (1891–1959), former President of the Philippines
 Juan Tomás Ávila Laurel (born 1966), Annobonese writer from Spanish Guinea (now Equatorial Guinea)
 Salvador Laurel (1928–2004), former Vice-President of the Philippines, son of José P. Laurel
 Sotero Laurel (1918–2009), Filipino politician, older brother of Salvador Laurel
 Stan Laurel (1890–1965), half of the comic duo Laurel and Hardy

See also
 Laurel (given name)